Sŏgwang-sa is a Korean Buddhist temple located in Sŏlbong-ri in Kosan County, Kangwon Province, North Korea. Once one of Korea's largest Buddhist temples, the complex was mostly destroyed by US bombing in 1951, and today it lies in ruins; however, it is slated to be reconstructed in coming years. It is listed as National Treasure #94

History
Founded at the end of the Koryo dynasty in 1386,  work continued on the temple into the Choson era. Consisting of over 50 buildings, the temple was once one of Korea's largest. During the Japanese occupation, the temple, known under its Japanized name as Shakuō-ji, became a popular tourist destination on the Seoul-Wonsan railway.

Unfortunately, almost all of the historic buildings in the temple compound have been destroyed; many were obliterated by a 1951 US bombing raid during the Korean War, and the remaining buildings, including a few reconstructions, were later destroyed by heavy flooding in 1986. The temple's many original art treasures, likewise, were incinerated in the raid.. Today, there are only four buildings standing, three of which are reconstructions; only Jogye Gate remains of the original buildings. Only foundation stones remain of the rest of the temple's structures. Some reconstruction work is set to be completed by Kim Il Sung's 100th birthday in 2012.

Composition
The temple was arranged with two main axes (known as the west and east Courts), with shrines, living quarters, and kitchens arranged around a courtyard fronting a main prayer hall. The east court was the larger of the two, and contained the temple's most impressive buildings and most valuable pieces of art.

The temple's entrance is through Puri Gate ("Gate of Nonduality"), situated on a stone bridge over a quiet stream. This bridge symbolically represents the link between the mundane world and the sanctified temple precincts. It was one of the few buildings to survive the American bombing of 1951, but was later washed away by flooding in 1986. It has since been reconstructed. A winding path leads to the temple's second gate, Jogye Gate (조계문/), which allowed entrance to the main temple. Completed in 1783, the gate is the only original building remaining. With a heavy tiles roof supported by only two small wooden pillars, the gate is the temple's most unusual feature and known as one of the most beautiful temple gates in Korea. The gate is estimated to have a combined weight of 100 tonnes. It is often shown as an example of the sophisticated architectural techniques of the Joseon era.

In the courtyard between Jogye Gate and the ruins of the east court stands Sŏlsŏngdong Pavilion, a two-storied construct first built in 1730. Originally located overlooking the stream, the pavilion was rebuilt after the Korean war only to be knocked over during a particularly heavy flood. It was moved to this location when it was again reconstructed in 1987.

Of the grand east court, only the reconstructed Hoji Gate ("Gate of Sustaining") exists. Originally built in 1392, the gate originally housed ornate statues of the Four Heavenly Kings. The gate burnt down during the Korean war along with the rest of the temple, but was rebuilt afterward.

Taeung Hall was built in 1731 as the temple's main prayer hall. As the focal point of the east court, it was by far the largest and most impressive buildings in the compound. It also housed many of the temple's greatest treasures a collection of icons and nine statues of various Buddhist guardians, saints (arhats), and deities. Unfortunately, it too was completely destroyed by the American forces in 1951. Reconstruction on it is slated to begin in 2009.

Of the smaller west court, only foundation stones remain. Ŭngjin Hall, located at its center, was the first of the temple buildings to be constructed and the court's main prayer hall.. The hall was begun in 1386 at the end of the Koryo dynasty and later finished under the Yi. It housed a statue of Buddha, as well as icons of five hundred of his disciples. Unfortunately, this hall was too completely destroyed by US bombing in 1951. To its east and west stood Inji and Ryongbi Pavilions, which were reconstructed after the war but destroyed during the 1986 floods.

Hidden behind the ruins of the western court is the temple cemetery,  including many stele commemorating the temple's greatest monks. The gravestones are listed as Cultural asset #311.

See also
National Treasures of North Korea
Korean Buddhism
Korean architecture

References

External link

Buildings and structures in Kangwon Province
Buddhist temples in North Korea
National Treasures of North Korea
1386 establishments